On the Science of the Pulse (Persian: اندر دانش رگ Andar dāneš-e rag, also known as Resāla-ye nabż) is a Persian medical book written by Abū Alī ibn Sīnā (Avicenna). It is one of the author's only two books in Persian language.

Subject matter
The book is skillfully organized into nine chapters. The first three provide a general view of the functions of the human body as prologue to the main subject, being the study of the pulse. The following three chapters deal with the pulse. Chapters 7 and 8 summarize ideas about the pulse from The Canon of Medicine. The final chapter closes the book with complementary remarks on the relevant parts in The Canon of Medicine.

Intended audience
Unlike his Arabic works, Avicenna intended this book for general readership, thus composing it in the vernacular.

Notes and references

Works by Avicenna
Medical works of medieval Iran
Medical works of the medieval Islamic world
11th-century Arabic books
Iranian books
Iranian literature